The Tachikawa Ki-74 (Allied reporting name "Patsy") was a Japanese experimental long-range reconnaissance bomber of World War II. A twin-engine, mid-wing monoplane, it was developed for the Imperial Japanese Army Air Service but never deployed in combat. The Ki-74 was designed for high altitude operation with a pressurized cabin for its crew.

Development
Though already conceived in 1939 as a long-range reconnaissance aircraft capable of reaching west of Lake Baikal when operating from bases in Manchukuo (Manchuria), the initial prototype Ki-74 only first flew as late as March 1944, after its development and primary mission requirement had been changed to capability of bombing and reconnaissance over the mainland United States. The aircraft was powered by two  Mitsubishi Ha-211-I [Ha-43-I] radial engines. The subsequent two prototypes were powered by the turbo-supercharged Mitsubishi Ha-211-I Ru [Ha-43-II]; these experienced teething troubles and the following thirteen pre-production machines substituted the Ha-211 Ru engine for the lower-powered but more reliable turbo-supercharged Mitsubishi Ha-104 Ru (Army Type 4 1,900 hp Air Cooled Radial). The aircraft was fitted with self-sealing fuel tanks, armor and a pressurized cabin for its crew of 5.

Operational history
The Ki-74 did not progress beyond developmental testing to see operational service in combat. Nevertheless, the Allies knew of the type's existence and assigned the codename "Patsy" after it was discovered that it was a bomber, not a fighter (previously it had been assigned the codename "Pat" in Allied Intelligence).

Specifications (Ki-74)

See also

References
Notes

Bibliography

External links

 Ki-74 Patsy at www.hikotai.net
 Ki-74 Patsy at ww2drawings.jexiste.fr
  Ki-74 Patsy at The Imperial Japanese Secret Weapons Museum

1940s Japanese military reconnaissance aircraft
Ki-74
Mid-wing aircraft
Aircraft first flown in 1944
Twin piston-engined tractor aircraft